Sea Shadow is a 2011 Emirati coming-of-age film written by Mohammed Hassan Ahmed and directed by Nawaf Al-Janahi. The film was the first from Image Nation to be filmed in the United Arab Emirates. The film premiered at the Abu Dhabi Film Festival in October 2011 and was released in theaters throughout the Arab states of the Persian Gulf in November 2011. It premiered in the United States at the Palm Springs International Film Festival in January 2012.

Synopsis

Two Emirati teenagers, Mansoor and Kaltham, live in a small neighborhood by the sea. They face their families' traditional values as they consider what paths to take as adults.

Cast

Production

Sea Shadow is written by Mohammed Hassan Ahmed and directed by Nawaf Al-Janahi, who directed the short film Mirrors of Silence and the feature film The Circle. Al-Janahi read the screenplay for Sea Shadow in late 2009 and was considering directing it when Imagenation Abu Dhabi (now Image Nation), impressed with The Circle, approached him with the opportunity to direct. The company, founded in 2008, developed and financed Sea Shadow as its first film to be produced in the United Arab Emirates.  Reuters reported that Sea Shadow deals with the theme of modernization among Arab societies in the Persian Gulf region. The story moves from Ras al-Khaimah through Dubai to Abu Dhabi. Screenwriter Ahmed said, "The aim is to reflect a completely Emirati atmosphere, from the towers, buildings and modern cities to the old quarters where Emiratis still live." With a production budget of 3.67 million AED, filming took place in October and November 2010.

Release

Critical reception

Mark Adams at Screen Daily called Sea Shadow "a gentle and delightfully shot" film. He said it lacked "real drama" but made up for it "in terms of charming performances and deep-rooted sense of honesty". Jay Weissberg at Variety said the film did not connect scenes well enough. He said of the main characters, "Scenes between the two friends are the strong point here, but simple dialogue crosses the line from unsophisticated to simplistic, and the pic rarely comes alive."

References

External links

2011 films
2010s coming-of-age films
Emirati drama films
Films set in the United Arab Emirates
Films shot in the United Arab Emirates